Ripu Malla was the Maharajadhiraja of the Khasa Kingdom who reigned in the early 14th century. He is best remembered for being last visitor to Lumbini, the birthplace of the Lord Buddha that left inscription of his visit.

In 1312, he visited Lumbini and left in an inscription in Nigali Sagar that reads "Om Mani Padme Hum Sri Ripu Malla Chidam Jayatu Sangrama Malla (May Prince Ripu Malla be long victorious)". After his visit, Lumbini universally known to be the birthplace of the Lord Buddha disappeared and slowly became a forest, due to the decline of Buddhism in the Indian subcontinent. The pillar was re-discovered in 1893 by Khadga Shumsher Jung Bahadur Rana.

The same year, he invaded the Kathmandu Valley (then known as Nepal Valley). In Kathmandu, According to the Gopal Raj Vamshavali, Malla reportedly publicly worshiped at Swayambhunath, Matsyendranath, and Pashupatinath Temple to show his supremacy in Nepal.

References 

14th-century Nepalese people
Nepalese royalty
Nepalese Buddhists